Domenico Mudazio (died 1617) was a Roman Catholic prelate who served as Bishop of Chiron (1605–1617).

Biography
On 10 Oct 1605, Domenico Mudazio was appointed during the papacy of Pope Paul V as Bishop of Chiron. He served as Bishop of Chiron until his death in 1617.

References 

17th-century Roman Catholic bishops in the Republic of Venice
Bishops appointed by Pope Paul V
1617 deaths